Sang Sara (also Romanized as Sang Sarā; also known as Sangsar) is a village in Otaqvar Rural District, Otaqvar District, Langarud County, Gilan Province, Iran. At the 2006 census, its population was 39, in 8 families.

References 

Populated places in Langarud County